The 1945 New Mexico Lobos football team represented the University of New Mexico in the Border Conference during the 1945 college football season.  In their fourth season under head coach Willis Barnes, the Lobos compiled a 6–1–1 record (1–0–1 against conference opponents), defeated Denver in the 1946 Sun Bowl, and outscored all opponents by a total of 208 to 61.

The team's 78–0 victory over  remains the second largest margin of victory in New Mexico school history. Captains were appointed by game for the 1945 season.

Schedule

References

New Mexico
New Mexico Lobos football seasons
New Mexico Lobos football